Bridget Hall (born December 12, 1977) is an American model.

Early life 
Hall was born in Springdale, Arkansas. At the age of 10 she was modeling in Dallas, Texas. At this time she was living in the suburb of Farmers Branch, where she briefly attended R. L. Turner High School. Shortly thereafter, she moved with her mother Donna Hall to New York City to pursue her modeling career.

Career 
By the age of 17, she was listed in Forbes as one of the "best ten" moneymaking supermodels along with Cindy Crawford and Christy Turlington.

Formerly with Ford Models, she signed with IMG Models and has appeared on fashion magazine covers such as Vogue,  Harper's Bazaar, ELLE and Allure and in fashion shows in New York City, Paris and Milan. Hall has worked for a wide variety of clients including Pepsi, Guess Jeans, and Anne Klein. Hall is also signed to Independent Models in London and 1 Model Management in New York City.

She was included in the Sports Illustrated Swimsuit Issue from 2002 to 2005. She was the object/subject of Joanne Gair body painting works in several editions.

References

External links 

Bridget Hall web page

1977 births
Living people
People from Springdale, Arkansas
People from Farmers Branch, Texas
Female models from Arkansas
Female models from Texas
21st-century American women